A perfect storm is a meteorological event aggravated by a rare combination of circumstances. The term is used by analogy to an unusually severe storm that results from a rare combination of meteorological phenomena.

Origin
The Oxford English Dictionary has published references going back to 1718 for "perfect storm", though the earliest citations use the phrase in the sense of "absolute" or "complete", or for emphasis, as in "a perfect stranger".

The phrase appears in William Makepeace Thackeray's novel Vanity Fair (1847-8)

The first known use of the expression in the meteorological sense is on May 30, 1850, when the Rev. Lloyd of Withington (Manchester, England) describes ″A perfect storm of thunder and lightning all over England (except London) doing fearful and fatal damage″ when recording monthly rainfall measurements for that year. This record is kept by the UK Meteorological Office. The next recorded instance is in the March 20, 1936, issue of the Port Arthur News in Texas: "The weather bureau describes the disturbance as 'the perfect storm' of its type. Seven factors were involved in the chain of circumstances that led to the flood."

In 1993, journalist and author Sebastian Junger planned to write a book about a fishing boat caught in the 1991 Halloween Nor'easter storm. Technically, this storm was an extratropical cyclone. In the course of his research, he spoke with Bob Case, who had been a deputy meteorologist in the Boston office of the National Weather Service at the time of the storm. Case described to Junger the confluence of three different weather-related phenomena that combined to create what Case referred to as the "perfect situation" to generate such a storm:
 warm air from a low-pressure system coming from one direction
 a flow of cool and dry air generated by a high-pressure from another direction
 tropical moisture provided by tropical storm (or hurricane)

From that, Junger keyed on Case's use of the word perfect and coined the phrase perfect storm, choosing to use The Perfect Storm as the title of his book.

Junger published his book The Perfect Storm in 1997 and its success brought the phrase into popular culture. Its adoption was accelerated with the release of the 2000 feature film adaptation of Junger's book.
Since the release of the movie, the phrase has grown to mean any event where a situation is aggravated drastically by an exceptionally rare combination of circumstances. 
 
Although the 1991 Halloween Nor'easter was a powerful storm by any measure, there have been other storms that have exceeded its strength. 
According to Case, the type of convergence of weather events to which he was referring, while unusual, is not exceptionally rare or unique, despite the way the phrase is commonly used.

Other uses
From the beginning, the phrase was in heavy use during the financial crisis of 2007–2008, even to the point of pundits anticipating "another perfect storm".

The phrase was awarded the top prize by Lake Superior State University in their 2007 list of words that deserve to be banned for overuse.

See also
Blizzard
Butterfly effect
Hypercane
Spring tide
Superstorm
Synergy

References

External links

National Climate Data Center

Weather hazards
Storm
1710s neologisms